The Bartholomew J. Donnelly House is a historic home in Daytona Beach, Florida, United States. It is located at 801 North Peninsula Drive. On August 2, 1993, it was added to the U.S. National Register of Historic Places.

References

External links

 Volusia County listings at National Register of Historic Places

Houses on the National Register of Historic Places in Volusia County, Florida
Buildings and structures in Daytona Beach, Florida